The Federal Ministries of Nigeria are civil service departments that are responsible for delivering various types of government service. Each ministry is headed by a Permanent Secretary who reports to a Minister in the Federal Cabinet. 
Some government functions are provided by "commissions" or parastatals (government-owned corporations) that may be independent or associated with a ministry.

Ministries
At times,  ministries are amalgamated and at other times they are split. Thus Halima Tayo Alao was appointed Minister of Environment and Housing on 26 July 2007 by President Umaru Yar'Adua.
After a cabinet reshuffle, in December 2008 Nduese Essien was appointed Minister of Environment and Hassan Muhammed Lawal was appointed Minister of Works and Housing.
On 6 April 2010, Mohammed Daggash was appointed Minister of Works and Nduese Essien was appointed Minister of Lands, Housing & Urban Development.
The table below lists current or past ministries.

Commissions

See also
Cabinet of Nigeria
Nigerian Civil Service

References

 
Public administration
Government of Nigeria